Mark Geraint Sampson (born 18 October 1982) is a Welsh football coach who was most recently a first team coach at Stevenage. He has also been a manager of the England women's team.

Playing career
Born and raised in Creigiau, a suburb of Cardiff, Sampson played amateur football for Cardiff Corinthians, where his brother was the manager.

Management career

Early years 
After completing a BA in sports development at the University of Wales Institute, Sampson was employed by the Football Association of Wales Trust in 2003 as a coach co-ordinator. He went on to become a coach, teaching youth players at Cardiff City.

In 2007, Sampson became head of Swansea City's centre of excellence whilst the club was under the management of Roberto Martínez, working there until 2009. He was appointed manager of Welsh Football League club Taff's Well in November 2008, having previously been youth team coach at the club. The following year, he was also appointed manager of FA Women's Premier League club Bristol Academy, leaving Taff's Well in May 2010. He led the club to finish as runners up in the 2013 FA WSL season, the club's best-ever finish, and to FA Women's Cup finals in 2010–11 and 2012–13.

England women 
In December 2013 Sampson was appointed manager of the England women's team. In March 2015 England won the Cyprus Cup. In the 2015 FIFA Women's World Cup later in the year, he led England to the semi-finals, marking the first time England had won a match beyond the group stage of a World Cup. After losing the semi-final to Japan, England secured victory in the match for third place, beating Germany for the first time in 21 games.

On 20 September 2017, Sampson was sacked as the manager of the England women's national team because of what the FA described as, "clear evidence of inappropriate and unacceptable behaviour by a coach" during his tenure as the manager of Bristol Academy prior to his appointment as England coach in 2014. An FA investigation into the allegations that led to his dismissal had concluded in 2014 that, "he did not pose a risk working in the game" but the decision to terminate his employment was taken when senior FA figures read the full report in 2017.

This sacking followed FA investigations into allegations of racist behaviour and remarks by Sampson, brought by Eniola Aluko. The FA oversaw two investigations, the second of them an independent investigation by a barrister, Katharine Newton, which cleared Sampson. The FA reasserted, in their press release regarding his dismissal, that they continued to have confidence in those findings and his dismissal was unrelated to that issue saying, "In respect of investigations into specific allegations made by Eniola Aluko in 2016, The FA stands by the findings of the independent barrister Katharine Newton's investigation. Sampson subsequently brought an unfair dismissal case against the FA.

On 18 October 2017, the FA apologised to players Eniola Aluko and Drew Spence after Katharine Newton concluded, on a balance of probabilities, in a third investigation that Mark Sampson made comments that were "discriminatory on the grounds of race". The FA agreed to pay a "significant " financial settlement to Sampson in January 2019, on the week his claim for unfair dismissal was due to be heard in court.

Stevenage 
Mark Sampson was appointed as a first-team coach of Stevenage on 4 July 2019. Sampson was appointed as caretaker manager on 9 September 2019 after the sacking of Dino Maamria. Subsequently, Sampson was accused of using racist language in a coaches meeting by former first team coach Ali Uzunhasanoglu. Maamria also gave evidence against Sampson. The complaint was made a week after the meeting and after Uzunhasanoglu and Maamria had left the club. Stevenage denied the accusations, while the FA said they would investigate. On 20 November 2019 Sampson was charged by the FA for using racist language. On 15 December 2019 Stevenage announced that Graham Westley would return for this fourth stint as Stevenage's head coach, restoring Sampson to his previous role as a first team coach. During his oversight the club played 18 matches, winning five, with seven draws, and six losses. On 20 January 2020, the charge against Sampson of using racist language was dismissed as not proven by the FA independent commission. On 12 May 2020 Sampson confirmed he was taking legal action after the allegations were dismissed. Stevenage finished the 2019–20 season in 23rd place, but were reprieved from relegation thanks to Bury's expulsion from League One, and after Macclesfield Town was deducted four points for failing to both pay their players' wages and to fulfil a fixture. The following season Stevenage finished in 14th place. Sampson remained with the club until his departure on November 8, 2021, at which time Stevenage were in 21st place in the league table.

Honours
England Women
2015 Cyprus Women's Cup
2015 FIFA Women's World Cup: Third place

References

External links

Mark Sampson The FA

1982 births
Living people
Footballers from Cardiff
Alumni of Cardiff Metropolitan University
Swansea City A.F.C. non-playing staff
Cardiff City F.C. non-playing staff
Welsh football managers
Women's Super League managers
Bristol City W.F.C. managers
England women's national football team managers
2015 FIFA Women's World Cup managers
Welsh footballers
Cardiff Corinthians F.C. players
Association football defenders
Stevenage F.C. non-playing staff
Stevenage F.C. managers
English Football League managers
Association football coaches
Taff's Well A.F.C. managers